The International Association of Plumbing and Mechanical Officials (IAPMO) coordinates the development and adaptation of plumbing, mechanical, swimming pool and solar energy codes to meet the specific needs of individual jurisdictions both in the United States and abroad. IAPMO develops and publishes the Uniform Plumbing Code (UPC); Uniform Mechanical Code (UMC); Uniform Swimming Pool, Spa and Hot Tub Code (USPSHTC); and the Uniform Solar Energy and Hydronics Code (USEHC), which as of 2018 is known as the Uniform Solar, Hydronics and Geothermal Code (USHGC).

History
IAPMO was founded on May 17, 1926, with the mandate "to advance the latest and most improved methods of sanitation; to promote the welfare of and harmony between the owner, the builder, and the craftsman; to accomplish a uniformity in the application of the provisions of the ordinances; and to promulgate the mutual benefit of the members."

The founding members of IAPMO first gathered to begin writing a model code to protect the health of the people they served from inept plumbing practices. There were 39 Southern California plumbing inspectors in the first group, including Charles Collard, the association's first president, and Stephen Smoot, who served as association secretary from 1926 to 1954.

IAPMO's Uniform Codes are now utilized worldwide.

See also
 IAPMO R&T
 IAPMO Standards
 Uniform Codes
 Uniform Mechanical Code
 Uniform Plumbing Code
 Uniform Swimming Pool, Spa and Hot Tub Code
 Uniform Solar Energy and Hydronics Code
 Building officials
 IAPMO R&T Management Systems Registration

References

External links
Official Website
IAPMO Codes Website
Uniform Plumbing Code Website
Uniform Mechanical Code Website
Uniform Solar, Hydronics & Geothermal Code Website
Uniform Swimming Pool, Spa & Hot Tub Code Website

Safety codes
Plumbing organizations
Trade associations based in the United States
Non-profit organizations based in California